Yiche (Yicyu) is a Hanoish language spoken by 23,000 people in Honghe County, Yunnan, China (Lan 2009:11).

Distribution
Yiche is spoken in the following locations of Honghe County, Yunnan, China (Lan 2009:11).
Dayangjie Township 大羊街乡
Langdu Village 浪堵村, Langdi Township 浪堤乡
Hadie Village 哈垤村, Chegu Township 车古乡

The Yiche claim that their ancestors had migrated from a village along the shores of Dian Lake near Kunming, and moved south and crossed the Red River (Honghe) after being defeated by other ethnic groups (Lan 2009:3).

Classification
Yiche is a Hani language (fangyan 方言) that belongs to the Langza 浪杂 dialect cluster (tuyu 土语) of Honghe County.

Vocabulary
The following Yiche words are transcribed by Lan (2009) in pinyin. (Note: ss is equivalent to IPA [z].)

References

Lan Qing [澜清]. 2009. Fertility: The kinship of China Yicyu [丰饶：哈尼族奕车人的亲属关系]. Yunnan People's Press [云南人民出版社]. 

Southern Loloish languages
Languages of Yunnan
Honghe Hani and Yi Autonomous Prefecture